Geobaenus is a genus of beetles in the family Carabidae, containing the following species:

 Geobaenus australasiae Guerin-Meneville, 1830
 Geobaenus ingenuus Peringuey, 1896
 Geobaenus lateralis Dejean, 1829
 Geobaenus natalensis Basilewsky, 1949

References

Licininae